This article lists important figures and events in Malaysian public affairs during the year 1977, together with births and deaths of notable Malaysians. MAS Flight 653 was hijacked and crashed in Johor on 16 December, killing 100 people.

Incumbent political figures

Federal level
Yang di-Pertuan Agong: Sultan Yahya Petra
Raja Permaisuri Agong: Raja Perempuan Zainab
Prime Minister: Tun Hussein Onn
Deputy Prime Minister: Dato' Dr Mahathir Mohamad
Lord President: Mohamed Suffian Mohamed Hashim

State level
 Sultan of Johor: Sultan Ismail
 Sultan of Kedah: Sultan Abdul Halim Muadzam Shah
 Sultan of Kelantan: Tengku Ismail Petra (Regent)
 Raja of Perlis: Tuanku Syed Putra
 Sultan of Perak: Sultan Idris Shah II
 Sultan of Pahang: Sultan Ahmad Shah (Deputy Yang di-Pertuan Agong)
 Sultan of Selangor: Sultan Salahuddin Abdul Aziz Shah
 Sultan of Terengganu: Sultan Ismail Nasiruddin Shah
 Yang di-Pertuan Besar of Negeri Sembilan: Tuanku Jaafar
 Yang di-Pertua Negeri (Governor) of Penang: Tun Sardon Jubir
 Yang di-Pertua Negeri (Governor) of Malacca: Tun Syed Zahiruddin bin Syed Hassan
 Yang di-Pertua Negeri (Governor) of Sarawak:
 Tun Tuanku Bujang Tuanku Othman (until February)
 Tun Abang Muhammad Salahuddin (from February)
 Yang di-Pertua Negeri (Governor) of Sabah:
 Tun Mohd Hamdan Abdullah (Until November)
 Tun Datuk Ahmad Koroh (From November)

Events
24 January – Former Selangor Menteri Besar, Datuk Harun Idris was found guilty and sentenced by the High Court to six months jail for forgery and fined RM 15,000 or six months jail for abetting criminal breach of trust involving nearly RM 6.5 million worth of Bank Rakyat's stocks and shares
1 February test colour by RTM
24 April – Five children were killed in a saloon racing car accident at the Batu Tiga Circuit during the Malaysian Grand Prix.
11 May – The Tugu Negara (National Monument) was finally repaired and restored to its original state.
June – Construction began on the North–South Expressway project.
7 July – The 25th anniversary of Federal Land Development Authority (FELDA) was celebrated.
8 August – The 10th anniversary of Association of Southeast Asian Nations (ASEAN) was celebrated.
15 August – Communist Party of Malaya (CPM) assault group launched an ambush on the East–West Highway from Gerik, Perak to Jeli, Kelantan. Five soldiers from the 11th Battalion of the Askar Wataniah (Territorial Army) were ambushed by 30 Communist terrorists during left Post 8 for Post 5 on patrol and to obtain supplies.
27 September – Japan Airlines Flight 715 crashed at Subang, Selangor, killing 34 of the 79 people on board.
8 November – A State of emergency was declared in the state of Kelantan following a political impasse and street violence.
19–26 November – The 1977 Southeast Asian Games were held in Kuala Lumpur.
4 December – Malaysian Airline System Flight 653 was hijacked and crashed in Tanjung Kupang, Johor, killing all 100 people on board.

Births
17 February – Wong Choong Hann – Badminton player
Unknown date – Azmyl Yunor – Singer-songwriter

Deaths
14 January – Tan Sri Syed Jaabar Albar – UMNO General Secretary and Minister of Rural Development
10 October – Tun Mohd Hamdan Abdullah – Sabah state Yang di-Pertua Negeri (Governor) (1977)
20 December – Tan Sri Nik Ahmad Kamil Nik Mahmud – Speaker of the Dewan Rakyat (1974-1977)
Unknown date – Tun Abdul Malek Yusuf – Second Malacca state Yang di-Pertua Negeri (Governor) (1959–1971)

See also
 1977
 1976 in Malaysia | 1978 in Malaysia
 History of Malaysia

 
Years of the 20th century in Malaysia
Malaysia
Malaysia
1970s in Malaysia